This is a list of notable philosophers who either spent many productive years of their lives in Croatia or the country's citizens working abroad, in alphabetical order:



A
Đuro Arnold (1853–1941), philosopher, writer and pedagogue

B
Julije Bajamonti (1744–1800), polymath, physician, medical historian, encyclopedist, translator, composer and music theoretician
Karlo Balić (1899–1977), theologian, writer and philosopher
Pavo Barišić (born 1959), philosophical historian and bioethicist
Antun Bauer (1856–1937), theologian, philosopher and writer
Ruđer Josip Bošković (1711–1787), polymath, physicist, astronomer, mathematician, theologian, diplomat and poet
Branko Bošnjak (1923–1996), sociologist, comparatist, philosopher, writer and philosophical historian

C
Nadežda Čačinovič (born 1947), philosopher, sociologist and comparatist

D
Blaženka Despot (1930–2001), philosopher and sociologist
Branko Despot (born 1942), philosopher and philosophical historian
Markantun de Dominis (1560–1624), polymath, ecclesiastic, physicist, mathematician and philosopher
Vladimir Dvorniković (1888–1956), philosopher and ethno-psychologist
Rajmund Džamanjić (1587–1647), theologian, philosopher and linguist

E
Bruna Esih (born 1975), philosopher, historian and politician

F
Heda Festini (born 1928), philosopher and philosophical historian
Ljiljana Filipović (born 1951), philosopher and writer
Predrag Finci (born 1946), philosopher and essayist
Ivan Focht (1927–1992), philosopher, mycologist and critic
Matija Frkić (1583–1669), theologian and philosopher

G
Vlado Gotovac (1930–2000), essayist, poet, philosopher and politician 
Stjepan Gradić (1613–1683), polymath, astronomer, theologian, translator, poet and diplomat
Danko Grlić (1923–1984), marxist theorist and humanist
Nikola Vitov Gučetić (1596–1647), polymath, philosopher, physicist, science writer and politician

H
Anđelko Habazin (1924–1978), philosopher of science and historian
Herman Dalmatin (~1100–~1160), philosopher, astronomer, astrologer, mathematician and translator
Srećko Horvat (born 1983), marxist theorist and political philosopher

I
Rada Iveković (born 1945), philosopher, indologist, feminist and writer

J
Mislav Ježić (born 1952), philosopher, philologist and indologist

K
Milan Kangrga (1923–2008), social philosopher and marxist theorist
Daniel Kolak (born 1955), philosopher of science and religion
Mario Kopić (born 1965) philosopher, translator and writer
Antun Kržan (1835–1888), philosopher and theologian
Rajmund Kupareo (1914–1996), theological writer, philosopher, translator, composer and poet
Ivan Kuvačić (1923–2014), marxist and sociologist

L
Željko Loparić (born 1939), philosopher and historian of philosophy

M
Antun Mahnić (1850–1920), theologian and philosopher
Julije Makanec (1904–1945), politician, philosopher and writer
Ljubomir Maraković (1887–1959), literary historian, critic, writer and Catholic philosopher
Franjo Marković (1845–1914), philosopher and writer
Ignac Josip Dominik Martinović (1755–1795), theologian, philosopher, physicist and politician

P
Danilo Pejović (1928–2007), philosopher and editor
Franjo Petriš (1529–1597), polymath, philosopher, scientist, writer and humanist
Gajo Petrović (1927–1993), marxist theorist, humanist and editor
Žarko Puhovski (born 1946), philosopher and political scientist

R
Bonaventura Radonić (1888–1945), theologian and philosopher
Nino Raspudić (born 1975), philosopher, writer and political analyst

S
Neven Sesardić (born 1949), philosopher and geneticist
Viktor Sonnenfeld (1902–1969) (born 1949), translator and philosopher 
Josip Stadler (1843–1918), theologian, philosopher and writer
Ivan Supek (1915–2007), physicist, philosopher, writer, playwright, peace activist and humanist
Vanja Sutlić (1925–1989), philosopher, essayist and philosophical historian
Goran Švob (1925–1989), logician, philosopher and author

V
Matija Vlačić – Ilirik (1520–1575), theologian, historian, writer and philosopher
Faust Vrančić (1551–1617), polymath, inventor, engineer, humanist, linguist and latinist
Predrag Vranicki (1922–2002), Marxist humanist and philosopher

See also
 List of Croatian inventors
 List of Croatian artists

Notes

External links 

 Marin Gundulić – Croatian jesuit and scientist
 Stipe Kutleša – director of the Institute of Philosophy in Zagreb (2002–2006)
 Nenad Miščević – university professor in Croatia, Slovenia and Hungary
 Augustin Nalješković – one of the representatives of traditional scholastic renaissance philosophy
 Benedikt Rogačić – Jesuit from Dubrovnik who lived in Rome
 Srđan Vrcan – university professor in Rome, Pecs, Bergen, Moscow, Berlin, Paris etc.
 Franjo Zenko – director of the Institute of Philosophy in Zagreb (1980–1985)

 
Croatian
Philosophers